Sveti Križ Začretje is a village in and a municipality of  Krapina-Zagorje County in the Republic of Croatia. According to the 2011 census, there are 6,165 inhabitants of the area, the absolute majority of which are Croats.

References

Populated places in Krapina-Zagorje County
Municipalities of Croatia